Psi-Ops: The Mindgate Conspiracy is an action adventure video game developed by Midway Games for the Xbox, PlayStation 2 and Microsoft Windows platforms. The game was released in North America on June 14, 2004; the European release followed on October 1, 2004.

A traditional shooter in many respects, Psi-Ops banks on its ragdoll physics (by way of Havok 2.0) and variety of psychic powers to differentiate itself. In the game, the player is Nick Scryer, a "PSI-Operative" whose mind has been wiped to allow him to infiltrate a terrorist organization. However, he is captured and must fight his way out with the help of Sara, a double agent. As he progresses, he regains his PSI powers.

On June 9, 2008, the full version was offered as a free download hosted by FilePlanet with in-game advertising, but also allowing to purchase the game in order to remove the advertising. A FilePlanet subscription was required to receive the game. In December 2018, the website MajorGeeks now hosts the PC game as freeware.

Plot 
When the story begins, Nick Scryer has no memory of who he is, his mind having been wiped in order to infiltrate a terrorist organization known as The Movement. After being imprisoned, the player is released by Sara and given a drug to regain his memory and lost abilities. It begins with the game's most prominent power, telekinesis, and moves from there.

Nick also faces off against a plethora of former PSI-Operatives, all of whom have defected with the general that formerly led the PSI-Ops project. Each is specialized in a certain field of psychic ability (the first boss, for example, is an expert in mind control) and far more powerful in that field than Nick. Nick defeats them one by one; usually through creative combinations of his weaker but more varied psychic abilities.

As Nick moves his way through the organization, he learns of mysterious, psi-based objects that have been the focus of wars over the last century (a cutscene suggests these artifacts are in fact the causes of wars such as World War II). At the same time, he begins noticing strange behavior in Sara, who seems to rotate between friend and foe for no apparent reason. It is eventually discovered that Sara in fact has a twin, who is killed by Sara near the end of the game.

As the game comes to an end, the many artifacts are combined into a single device, which when combined with a special machine give the user nearly limitless psychic power. Nick regains his full memory while attempting to stop this. The general uses this device on himself, and is summarily defeated by Nick. Though his defeat is the same regardless of how the player goes about doing it, the point of the battle is to absorb some of the immense psychic power before the general, giving Nick a special weapon to use and a much better chance of defeating the general than if he had missed the opportunity to do so.

After the general is defeated, the device is broken back into its component artifacts, and two helicopter gunships promptly appear to recover them, not concerned with the lives of Nick or Sara. In the game's final cutscene, Nick crashes one of the helicopters with telekinesis.
The screen fades to black and the words "TO BE CONTINUED" appear.

Gameplay 
Most of the gameplay in Psi-Ops focuses on the use of Nick's various psychic powers, which are unlocked as the game progresses. Though there are numerous weapons available, only two can be carried at a time, one of which cannot be replaced (Nick's silenced pistol). The available weapons also become virtually useless in the later levels, especially against the larger armored enemies. The low ammo totals for each weapon also force a dependence on Nick's psychic powers, which are much more effective in practice. The player is given a meter that limits the total amount of energy they can expend at any given point, though like any power meter it can be restored through various methods. Unlike the game's antagonists, In which each one is a master of one Psi power, Nick is unique in that he has access to the full range of psychic abilities, albeit in a more limited form than the more specialized psychics. Other than his psychic abilities and the weapons he can wield, Nick may also attack with a melee punch.

To begin with Nick has no access to his psychic powers, but regains his memories of how to use them one by one at various points in the game. Each remembered event is followed by a training level instructing the player in each power's use. The powers are listed in the order which they are unlocked.

Telekinesis (TK) is the ability to move objects with the mind. This is Nick's "bread and butter" skill and has numerous uses, ranging from using loose items as projectiles, slamming enemies into walls, or flying on an object being levitated (TK Surf). By applying telekinesis to swinging ball chains, discarded boxes and debris, a stable environment can soon become a lethal battleground through the added benefit of Havok 2.0 ragdoll physics.
Remote Viewing (RV) gives Nick a literal out-of-body experience, separating his mind from his body and enabling the player to look anywhere within a short distance unhindered by walls or doors while their real body remains motionless. The distance determines the amount of power it consumes.
Mind Drain (MD) is used to absorb a target's mental energy to replenish Nick's own. So long as the target is unaware, unconscious, or dead, Nick can steal their mental energy. This will kill the target if they are still alive at the time and the process is completed. Catching a living target standing and unaware, or at the moment they stand up after being knocked down, will restore up to fifty percent of Nick's energy while causing the target's head to explode upon completion; unconscious and dead foes provide progressively lesser energy. Enemies missing a head will not yield any mental energy.
Mind Control (MC) allows Nick to enter another person's mind and take full control of their body. Much like RV, the drain on the player's energy is determined by distance. A controlled enemy can be used to attack other enemies or simply be made to commit suicide; enemies will promptly kill the person in question for acting as such. Several points in the game also require that Nick control enemies to reach switches he cannot reach on his own.
Pyrokinesis (PK) allows Nick to summon a wave of flame with a swing of his arm, igniting anything in its path a short distance ahead of Nick. It can be used to burn foes, start chain reactions with crates and/or explosive cans, or flush out enemies from hiding spots.
Aura View (AV) is the final power Nick acquires, allowing him to see beyond the visible spectrum. This allows the player to see things such as erased messages on whiteboards, invisible mines, and extra-dimensional "Aura Beasts."

Development
The game was also being developed for the Nintendo GameCube under the title ESPionage, but a release for that platform was later cancelled. "The original name, ESPionage, was a clever play on words, but it did not get across the idea of psionic powers as well as we wanted," said Eddy. "Dozens and dozens of names were considered and thrown out (my favorite bad idea was Psypocalypse) before we arrived at what we felt described the game."

Lawsuit 
On February 20, 2007, William L. Crawford III filed a copyright infringement suit against Midway. The complaint stated that Crawford had written a screenplay titled "Psi-Ops" sharing a similar premise and other similarities with the game, including some of the characters and their psychic abilities, and that Midway wrongfully appropriated and exploited Crawford's work without his permission. Midway has stated that they do not comment on legal matters. In December 2008, the United States District Court for the Central District of California issued a ruling granting summary judgment on all counts in Midway's favor, having found no evidence of copyright infringement.  (Case No. 2:07-cv-00967-FMC-JCx (docket entry No. 175))

Reception
GameSpot named Psi-Ops the best PlayStation 2 game of June 2004, and it was nominated for 8th Annual Interactive Achievement Awards for "Outstanding Achievement in Character or Story Development" and "Best Console Action/Adventure Game of the Year" nominations but lost to Fable and Grand Theft Auto: San Andreas respectively.

In 2009, GamesRadar included it among the games "with untapped franchise potential", commenting: "Midway's 2004 shooter combined traditional weaponry with its protagonist's psychic abilities (such as telekinesis), and received generally favorable reviews from critics and players. It was even reviewed better than the similarly-minded Force Unleashed, yet we still haven't seen a sequel." In 2010, UGO ranked as the #21 on the list of the games that need sequels. That same year, the game was included as one of the titles in the book 1001 Video Games You Must Play Before You Die.

See also
Second Sight

References

External links 
 Free ad-supported version (Working Link)
 Psi-Ops The Mindgate Conspiracy Widescreen Fix
 

2004 video games
Cancelled GameCube games
Cooperative video games
Midway video games
PlayStation 2 games
Third-person shooters
Stealth video games
Windows games
Xbox games
Video games about amnesia
Video games using Havok
Video games developed in the United States
Science fiction video games
Spy video games
Video games about telekinesis
Video games about spirit possession
Video games about telepathy
Video games about psychic powers